Aaron David Bernstein (6 April 1812, Danzig12 February 1884, Berlin) was a German Jewish author, reformer and scientist.

Biography

Author
His translation of the Song of Songs (published under the pseudonym of A. Bernstein, 1834) and his publication of Young Germany ("Das junge Deutschland) established his reputation as a writer among the literary critics of Berlin. He was the author of two Ghetto stories, Vögele der Maggid and Mendel Gibbor, being one of the originators of this genre of modern fiction.

Reformer
Bernstein supported synagogue reform and  "Reformjudentum" (the German version of Reform Judaism) and participated in the Revolution of 1848 in Berlin.  He was also a publicist and founded in 1849 the Urwählerzeitung, in which he published in 1852 some ultra-democratic articles which led to his imprisonment. The paper was finally suppressed in 1853, and Bernstein established the Volkszeitung, a journal devoted, like its predecessor, largely to the dissemination of democratic views.

His History of Revolution and Reaction in Prussia and Germany from the Revolution of 1848 up to the present (3 vols., 1883–1884) was a collection of political essays.  In the middle of the 19th century Bernstein took an active share in the movement for synagogue reform in Germany.

Scientist
His multivolume book From the Field of Natural Science (1853–1856), later republished under the title Popular Books on Natural Science (1880), was frequently reprinted and translated into nearly all the languages of Europe. It established Bernstein's reputation as an early popularizer of science.

Already in the edition of 1855, Bernstein published ideas on space, time and the speed of light which had appeared in the anonymous treatise The Stars and the Earth written by 'an unknown clear-sighted thinker.' It was not until 1874 when a new German edition appeared that the name of the author – Felix Eberty – was made public. When this edition was re-published in 1923, Albert Einstein wrote a preface.

A story in volume 16 of Bernstein's Naturwissenschaftliche Volksbücher about riding along with the electricity travelling through a telegraph wire is often credited with inspiring the 16-year-old Albert Einstein to think about travelling along with a beam of light and seeing it stationary.  Such thought experiments eventually led to his famous theory of special relativity.

"Wir reisen mit Hilfe eines elektrischen telegraphischen Apparats! Wir machen nämlich eine Phantasie-Reise, und da die Phantasie im Gehirn wohnt und im Gehirn etwas wirksam ist, das nach neueren Forschungen der Elektrizität sehr ähnlich ist, so machen wir eigentlich eine elektrische Reise in den Weltraum." → "We travel by means of an electrical telegraphic apparatus! We are going on a fantasy journey, and since the imagination resides in the brain and something is active in the brain which, according to recent research, is very similar to electricity, we are actually making an electrical journey into space."

Family
One of his sons was the physiologist Julius Bernstein. 
He was the uncle of Eduard Bernstein, a Social Democratic theorist and activist.

Notes

References
Andreas W. Daum, Wissenschaftspopularisierung im 19. Jahrhundert: Bürgerliche Kultur, naturwissenschaftliche Bildung und die deutsche Öffentlichkeit, 1848–1914. Munich: Oldenbourg, 1998, .

Jewish Encyclopedia

External links
 
 

19th-century German Jews
Jewish German writers
Writers from Gdańsk
1812 births
1884 deaths
People from West Prussia
German male writers